Felipe Paiva Endres (born 8 August 1981) is a Brazilian football coach. He is the head coach of Grêmio's women's team.

Career
Endres began his career at Internacional's youth setup in 2001. He subsequently worked in the under-17 squads of Portuguese sides Tirsense and Boavista before returning to Brazil in 2008, to work as an assistant manager of Porto Alegre.

In 2011, after working as an under-20 manager of Porto Alegre, Endres was named manager of the same category of Caxias. He was fired by the club in December of that year, and subsequently took over Juventude's under-17 squad in the following March.

In February 2013, Endres moved to Australia and took over South Melbourne's under-21 team. He returned to Ju in 2014, as an assistant of Roger Machado, and was subsequently named manager of the club's under-20s in September 2015.

On 20 January 2016, Endres left Juventude and joined Grêmio to work as an under-23 manager. In 2017, he was in charge of the team for two Primeira Liga matches, against Ceará and Cruzeiro.

On 4 October 2017, after being knocked out of the year's Copa FGF, Endres was sacked. He subsequently worked as Diego Gavilán's assistant at Deportivo Capiatá and Pelotas.

Endres subsequently replaced Gavilán at the helm of Pelotas on 18 June 2019, but was sacked on 3 October. In February 2020, he was named assistant of Umberto Louzer at Chapecoense.

Endres was also interim of Chape on three occasions during the 2021 campaign, being in charge of the club after Louzer, Mozart and Pintado left the club.

Managerial statistics

Notes

References

External links

1981 births
Living people
Sportspeople from Porto Alegre
Brazilian football managers
Campeonato Brasileiro Série A managers
Esporte Clube Pelotas managers
Associação Chapecoense de Futebol managers
Brazilian expatriate sportspeople in Portugal
Brazilian expatriate sportspeople in Australia
Brazilian expatriate sportspeople in Paraguay